The history of religion refers to the written record of human religious feelings, thoughts, and ideas. This period of religious history begins with the invention of writing about 5,200 years ago (3200 BCE). The prehistory of religion involves the study of religious beliefs that existed prior to the advent of written records. One can also study comparative religious chronology through a timeline of religion.  Writing played a major role in standardizing religious texts regardless of time or location, and making easier the memorization of prayers and divine rules. A small part of the Bible involves the collation of oral texts handed down over the centuries.

The concept of "religion" was formed in the 16th and 17th centuries. Sacred texts like the Bible, the Quran, and others did not have a word or even a concept of religion in the original languages and neither did the people or the cultures in which these sacred texts were written.

The word religion as used in the 21st century does not have an obvious pre-colonial translation into non-European languages. The anthropologist Daniel Dubuisson writes that "what the West and the history of religions in its wake have objectified under the name 'religion' is ... something quite unique, which could be appropriate only to itself and its own history". The history of other cultures' interaction with the "religious" category is therefore their interaction with an idea that first developed in Europe under the influence of Christianity.

History of study
It depicted religion as evolving with human culture, from polytheism to monotheism.

The  emerged at a time when scholarly study of the Bible and of church history flourished in Germany and elsewhere (see higher criticism, also called the historical-critical method). The study of religion is important: religion and similar concepts have often shaped civilizations' law and moral codes, social structure, art and music.

Origin

The earliest archeological evidence interpreted by some as suggestive of the emergence of religious ideas dates back several hundred thousand years, to the Middle and Lower Paleolithic periods: some archaeologists conclude that the apparently intentional burial of early Homo sapiens and Neanderthals as early as 300,000 years ago is proof that religious ideas already existed, but such a connection is entirely conjectural. Other evidence that some infer as indicative of religious ideas includes symbolic artifacts from Middle Stone Age sites in Africa. However, the interpretation of early paleolithic artifacts, with regard to how they relate to religious ideas, remains controversial. Archeological evidence from more recent periods is less controversial. Scientists generally interpret a number of artifacts from the Upper Paleolithic (50,000–13,000 BCE) as representing religious ideas. Examples of Upper Paleolithic remains that some associate with religious beliefs include the lion man, the Venus figurines, and the elaborate ritual burial from Sungir.

In the 19th century, researchers proposed various theories regarding the origin of religion, challenging earlier claims of a Christianity-like urreligion. Early theorists, such as Edward Burnett Tylor (1832–1917) and Herbert Spencer (1820–1903), emphasized the concept of animism, while archaeologist  John Lubbock (1834–1913) used the term "fetishism". Meanwhile, the religious scholar Max Müller (1823–1900) theorized that religion began in hedonism and the folklorist Wilhelm Mannhardt (1831–1880) suggested that religion began in "naturalism" – by which he meant mythological explanations for natural events. All of these theories have been widely criticized since then; there is no broad consensus regarding the origin of religion.

Pre-pottery Neolithic A (PPNA) Göbekli Tepe, the oldest potentially religious site yet discovered anywhere includes circles of erected massive T-shaped stone pillars, the world's oldest known megaliths decorated with abstract, enigmatic pictograms and carved-animal reliefs. The site, near the home place of original wild wheat, was built before the so-called Neolithic Revolution, i.e., the beginning of agriculture and animal husbandry around 9000 BCE. But the construction of Göbekli Tepe implies organization of an advanced order not hitherto associated with Paleolithic, PPNA, or PPNB societies. The site, abandoned around the time the first agricultural societies started, is still being excavated and analyzed, and thus might shed light on the significance it had, if any, for the religions of older, foraging communities, as well as for the general history of religions.

The Pyramid Texts from ancient Egypt, the oldest known religious texts in the world, date to between 2400 and 2300 BCE.

The earliest records of Indian religion are the Vedas, composed  during the Vedic Period.

Surviving early copies of religious texts include:

 The Upanishads, some of which date to the mid-first millennium BCE.
 The Dead Sea Scrolls, representing fragmentary texts of the Hebrew Tanakh. 
 Complete Hebrew texts, also of the Tanakh, but translated into the Greek language (Septuagint 300–200 BCE), were in wide use by the early 1st century CE. 
 The Zoroastrian Avesta, from a Sassanian-era master copy.

Axial age

Some historians have labelled the period from 900 to 200 BCE as the "axial age", a term coined by German-Swiss philosopher Karl Jaspers (1883–1969). According to Jaspers, in this era of history "the spiritual foundations of humanity were laid simultaneously and independently... And these are the foundations upon which humanity still subsists today." Intellectual historian Peter Watson has summarized this period as the foundation time of many of humanity's most influential philosophical traditions, including monotheism in Persia and Canaan, Platonism in Greece, Buddhism and Jainism in India, and Confucianism and Taoism in China. These ideas would become institutionalized in time – note for example Ashoka's role in the spread of Buddhism, or the role of Neoplatonic philosophy in Christianity at its foundation.

The historical roots of Jainism in India date back to the 9th-century BCE with the rise of Parshvanatha and his non-violent philosophy.

Middle Ages

World religions of the present day established themselves throughout Eurasia during the Middle Ages by:

 Christianization of the Western world
 Buddhist missions to East Asia
 the decline of Buddhism in the Indian subcontinent
 the spread of Islam throughout the Middle East, Central Asia, North Africa and parts of Europe and India

During the Middle Ages, Muslims came into conflict with Zoroastrians during the Muslim conquest of Persia (633–654); Christians fought against Muslims during the Arab–Byzantine wars (7th to 11th centuries), the Crusades (1095 onward), the Reconquista (718–1492), the Ottoman wars in Europe (13th century onwards) and the Inquisition; Shamanism was in conflict with Buddhists, Taoists, Muslims and Christians during the Mongol invasions and conquests (1206–1337); and Muslims clashed with Hindus and Sikhs during the Muslim conquests in the Indian subcontinent (8th to 16th centuries).

Many medieval religious movements continued to emphasize mysticism, such as the Cathars and related movements in the West, the Jews in Spain (see Zohar), the Bhakti movement in India and Sufism in Islam. Monotheism and related mysticisms reached definite forms in Christian Christology and in Islamic Tawhid. Hindu monotheist notions of Brahman likewise reached their classical form with the teaching of Adi Shankara (788–820).

Modern Ages
From the 15th century to the 19th century, European colonisation resulted in the spread of Christianity to Sub-Saharan Africa, and the Americas, Australia and the Philippines. The invention of the printing press in the 15th century played a major role in the rapid spread of the Protestant Reformation under leaders such as Martin Luther (1483–1546) and John Calvin (1509–1564).  Wars of religion broke out, culminating in the Thirty Years' War which ravaged Central Europe between 1618 and 1648. The 18th century saw the beginning of secularisation in Europe, a trend which gained momentum after the French Revolution broke out in 1789. By the late 20th century, religion had declined in most of Europe.

By 2001, people began to use the internet in order to discover or adhere to their religious beliefs. In January 2000, the website beliefnet was established, and by the following year, it had over 1.7 million visitors every month.

See also

 Growth of religion
 Historiography of religion
 Religion and politics
 Christianity and politics
 Judaism and politics
 Political aspects of Islam
 Women and religion
 Women as theological figures
 List of founders of religious traditions
 List of religions and spiritual traditions
 List of religious movements that began in the United States

Shamanism and ancestor worship
 Prehistoric religion
 Shamanism
 Animism
 Ancestor worship
 Tribal religion

Panentheism
 Sikhism
 Neoplatonism

Polytheism

 Ancient Near Eastern religion, Egyptian mythology
 Ancient Greek religion, Ancient Roman religion
 Germanic paganism, Finnish Paganism, Norse paganism
 Maya religion, Inca religion, Aztec religion
 Neopaganism, Polytheistic reconstructionism

Monotheism

 Aten
 Baháʼí Faith
 History of the Baháʼí Faith
 Judaism
 History of Mandaeism
 Neoplatonism
 History of Christianity
 History of the Catholic Church
 History of Eastern Orthodox Christianity
 History of Protestantism
 History of Jehovah's Witnesses
 Mormonism
 History of the Latter Day Saint movement
 History of The Church of Jesus Christ of Latter-day Saints
 History of Islam
 Zoroastrianism

Monism

 History of Buddhism
 History of Jainism
 History of Hinduism

Dualism
 Gnosticism

New religious movements

 Rastafari movement
 History of Wicca
 Timeline of Scientology
 Adventism
 Jehovah's Witnesses
 Mormonism
 Pentecostalism
 Bábism
 Bahá'í Faith
 Spiritualism
 History of Spiritism
 Thelema
 Ahmadiyya
 Nation of Islam

References

Citations

Sources

Further reading
 Armstrong, Karen. A History of God: The 4,000-Year Quest of Judaism, Christianity and Islam (1994) excerpt and text search
 Armstrong, Karen. Islam: A Short History (2002)  excerpt and text search
 Bowker, John Westerdale, ed. The Oxford Dictionary of World Religions (2007)  excerpt and text search 1126pp
 Carus, Paul. The history of the devil and the idea of evil: from the earliest times to the present day (1899) full text
 Eliade, Mircea, and Joan P. Culianu. The HarperCollins Concise Guide to World Religion: The A-to-Z Encyclopedia of All the Major Religious Traditions (1999) covers 33 principal religions, including Buddhism, Christianity, Jainism, Judaism, Islam, Shinto, Shamanism, Taoism, South American religions, Baltic and Slavic religions, Confucianism, and the religions of Africa and Oceania.
 Eliade, Mircea ed. Encyclopedia of Religion (16 vol. 1986; 2nd ed 15 vol. 2005; online at Gale Virtual Reference Library). 3300 articles in 15,000 pages by 2000 experts.
 Ellwood, Robert S. and Gregory D. Alles. The Encyclopedia of World Religions (2007), p 528; for middle schools
 Gilley, Sheridan; Shiels, W. J. History of Religion in Britain: Practice and Belief from Pre-Roman Times to the Present (1994), p. 590.
 
 Marshall, Peter. "(Re)defining the English Reformation," Journal of British Studies, July 2009, Vol. 48#3 pp 564–586
 Rüpke, Jörg, Religion, EGO – European History Online, Mainz: Institute of European History, 2020, retrieved: March 8, 2021.
 Schultz, Kevin M.; Harvey, Paul. "Everywhere and Nowhere: Recent Trends in American Religious History and Historiography," Journal of the American Academy of Religion, March 2010, Vol. 78#1 pp. 129–162
 Wilson, John F. Religion and the American Nation: Historiography and History (2003) p. 119.

External links
 Historyofreligions.com
 The history of religious and philosophical ideas, in ''Dictionary of the History of Ideas
 History of Religion as flash animation
 The history and origins of world religions depicted as a navigable tree